José María Casanovas (born 22 March 1955) is an Argentine fencer. He competed at the 1976 and 1984 Summer Olympics.

References

1955 births
Living people
Argentine male fencers
Argentine sabre fencers
Olympic fencers of Argentina
Fencers at the 1976 Summer Olympics
Fencers at the 1984 Summer Olympics
Pan American Games medalists in fencing
Pan American Games bronze medalists for Argentina
Fencers at the 1975 Pan American Games
Fencers at the 1979 Pan American Games